is a Japanese former professional footballer who played as a midfielder or defender. He played for the Japan national team until 2002. He currently manager of SC Sagamihara.

Club career
Toda was born in Machida on 30 December 1977. After graduating from high school, he joined Shimizu S-Pulse in 1996. He played many matches as left defender. The club won 1999–2000 Asian Cup Winners' Cup. In 2001, he was converted to defensive midfielder as Santos successor. The club won the champions 2001 Emperor's Cup. In 2003, he moved to England and signed with Tottenham Hotspur, but only played four games for the team. In 2004, he moved to Netherlands club ADO Den Haag. In July, he returned to Shimizu S-Pulse. In 2005, he moved to Tokyo Verdy. However the club relegated to J2 League and he moved to Sanfrecce Hiroshima in 2006. The club was relegated to J2 League and his opportunity to play decreased in 2008 and he moved to JEF United Chiba in June 2008. Toward end of his career, he played for Gyeongnam, Thespa Kusatsu, FC Machida Zelvia and Warriors. He retired end of 2013 season.

Managerial career
On 14 November 2022, he will be announced that the manager of J3 club, SC Sagamihara top team will be appointed from the 2023 season.

International career
In August 1993, Toda was selected Japan U17 national team for 1993 U-17 World Championship. He played all four matches. In June 1997, he was also selected Japan U20 national team for 1997 World Youth Championship. He played full-time in all five matches as left defender of three backs defense.

In February 2001, Toda was selected Japan national team for 2001 Confederations Cup. At this tournament, on 31 May, he debuted against Canada. He played four matches as defensive midfielder and Japan achieved second place. After this tournament, he played most matches for Japan until 2002 World Cup. At 2002 World Cup, he played the full 90 minutes in all four matches in a defensive midfielder pairing with Junichi Inamoto. He played 20 games and scored 1 goal for Japan until 2002.

Career statistics

Club

International

Scores and results list Japan's goal tally first, score column indicates score after each Toda goal.

Managerial statistics

.

Honours
Japan
 FIFA Confederations Cup runner-up: 2001

References

External links

Japan National Football Team Database

1977 births
Living people
Association football people from Tokyo
Japanese footballers
Association football midfielders
Japan international footballers
Japan youth international footballers
Premier League players
Eredivisie players
K League 1 players
Singapore Premier League players
J1 League players
J2 League players
Shimizu S-Pulse players
Tottenham Hotspur F.C. players
ADO Den Haag players
Tokyo Verdy players
Sanfrecce Hiroshima players
JEF United Chiba players
Gyeongnam FC players
Thespakusatsu Gunma players
FC Machida Zelvia players
Warriors FC players
2002 FIFA World Cup players
2001 FIFA Confederations Cup players
Footballers at the 1998 Asian Games
Asian Games competitors for Japan
Japanese expatriate footballers
Japanese expatriate sportspeople in England
Expatriate footballers in England
Japanese expatriate sportspeople in the Netherlands
Expatriate footballers in the Netherlands
Japanese expatriate sportspeople in South Korea
Expatriate footballers in South Korea
Japanese expatriate sportspeople in Singapore
Expatriate footballers in Singapore
J3 League managers
SC Sagamihara managers